This page attempts to list the longest non-repetitive piano pieces along with approximate duration. The number of pages their scores cover and their formats are listed where available.

Works that have been performed or recorded

Works that have not yet been performed or recorded

See also 
 Vexations

 As Slow as Possible

 Licht

 Kaikhosru Shapurji Sorabji

Notes and references

Notes

References 

 
Piano pieces